Lucy Hamilton may refer to:
Lucy Hamilton (cricketer) (born 2006), Australian cricketer
Lucy Hamilton (musician), American singer
Lucy Hamilton Hooper (1835–1893), American poet